Elections to Hampshire County Council took on 6 May 2021 as part of the 2021 United Kingdom local elections. All 78 seats were up for election, with each ward returning either one or two councillors by first-past-the-post voting for a four-year term of office. This took place at the same time as the elections for the Hampshire Police and Crime Commissioner and district councils.

Background 
Whilst an election for the county council had already been planned, district council elections were delayed due to the ongoing COVID-19 pandemic, meaning that they are due to be held at the same time as the Hampshire County Council Elections. Whilst not part of Hampshire County Council, the unitary authorities of Portsmouth and Southampton are also due to hold council elections for a third of their respective councils at the same time.

After the previous election in 2017, the Conservatives held 56 seats, the Liberal Democrats 19, Labour 2, and Community Campaign Hart 1.

In July 2019, Cllr Floss Mitchell resigned from the Conservative Party to sit as an unaffiliated independent.

In December 2019, Cllr Michael Westbrook left the Labour Party alongside borough councillors to form the Basingstoke & Deane Independent Group sitting with Community Campaign Hart as an independent grouping on the County Council.

In December 2020, Conservative Cllr Keith Evans died from COVID-19.

As such, the Conservatives and Labour lost two councillors and a single councillor respectively, in the time since the previous election.

Summary

Election result

WBCP = Whitehill & Borden Community Party

|-

The Conservatives won 56 seats, the same number as in the previous election. Labour won 3 seats, an increase of 1. Community Campaign Hart, which had previously held 1 county council seat, failed to secure the two seats they ran in. An Independent candidate won in Bishopstoke & Fair Oak, and the Whitehill & Bordon Community Party won the seat they ran in of the same name.

Results by electoral division
Hampshire County Council is divided into 11 districts, which are split further into electoral divisions, and then split into a number of wards. 
Councillors seeking re-election were elected in 2017, and are compared to that year's polls on that basis.

Basingstoke and Deane (10 seats)

East Hampshire (7 seats)

Eastleigh (8 seats)

Fareham (7 seats)

Gosport (5 seats)

Hart (5 seats)

Havant (7 seats)

New Forest (10 seats)

Rushmoor (5 seats)

Test Valley (7 seats)

Winchester (7 seats)

See also 

 2021 Basingstoke and Deane Borough Council Election
 2021 Eastleigh Borough Council Election
 2021 Fareham Borough Council Election
 2021 Gosport Borough Council Election
 2021 Hart District Council Election
 2021 Havant Borough Council Election
 2021 Rushmoor Borough Council Election
 2021 Winchester City Council Election

References 

Hampshire County Council elections
2021 English local elections
2020s in Hampshire